Sonoran mountain kingsnake may refer to:
Lampropeltis knoblochi
Lampropeltis pyromelana